The Rose of Battle is a poem by William Butler Yeats, from his second poetry collection: The Countess Kathleen and Various Legends and Lyrics (1892).

Popular culture
The title of Libba Bray's novel The Sweet Far Thing comes from The Rose of Battle.

External links
The Rose of Battle at kalliope.org

Rose of Battle, The